Dündar Ali Osman (30 December 1930 – 18 January 2021), also known as Dündar Ali Osman Osmanoğlu, with a surname as required by the Republic of Turkey, or known by the Ottoman imperial name as Şehzade (Prince) Dündar Ali Osman Osmanoğlu Efendi, was the 45th Head of the House of Osman, which ruled the Ottoman Empire from 1299 until the abolition of the Sultanate in 1922.

Early and personal life
Şehzade Dündar Ali Osman Osmanoğlu was born on 30 December 1930 in Damascus in present-day Syria. He was a great-grandson of Ottoman Sultan Abdul Hamid II. His grandfather was Şehzade Mehmed Selim and his father was Şehzade Mehmed Abdülkerim. He had a full-brother, Harun, born in 1932. Osmanoğlu was married to Yüsra Hanım and was childless. She died on 25 July 2017 in Damascus.

Later life and death
In 1974, the Ottoman family was allowed to return to Turkey. However, Osmanoğlu refused to migrate and stayed in Damascus in Syria, even though most of the family members returned to Istanbul.

The Syrian Civil War broke in 2011 and media reports emerged in 2013 that Osmanoğlu was stranded in Syria. In August 2017, he was evacuated on the order of Recep Tayyip Erdoğan, the president of Turkey. Osmanoğlu was initially evacuated to Beirut in Lebanon. Later, he moved to Istanbul.

Dündar Ali Osman died on 18 January 2021 in Damascus at the age of 90 and was succeeded by his brother Harun Osman as the head of the house.

Ancestry

See also
 Line of succession to the former Ottoman throne

References 

1930 births
2021 deaths
People from Damascus
Heads of the Osmanoğlu family